Kochichthys is a monotypic genus of percomorph fish from the family Pinguipedidae. The only species in the genus, Kochichthys flaviofasciatus, is found in the western Pacific in the waters around Japan, having been recorded only from Tosa Bay in Kōchi Prefecture on the island of Shikoku.

References

Pinguipedidae
Monotypic fish genera
Fish described in 1936